The 'Amalgamated Workers Union' (AWU) is a trade union in Trinidad and Tobago. AWU was formed in 1936 and originally registered in 1938 as the Amalgamated Building and Woodworkers Union following the historic Butler-led labour rebellions of that era. It was a time before sewers when garbage was carried away by donkey carts out of the nation's sceptic tanks in the middle of the night by the bucket and barrel. More than eighty years later, while the machinery may have changed to pumps and metal trucks, The Union's core membership remains the same. The members continue to be the vital Workers on the ground, the bedrock and lifeblood of our capital city and our nation: the sanitation support Workers of the Port of Spain Corporation; the Clerks and Cleaners in downtown malls of East Side Plaza and New City Mall; the factory Workers at the internationally  recognized Bermudez Biscuit Company; the Funeral Attendants and Drivers at Belgroves Funeral Home; the Cooks and Counter-staff of local fast-food giant, Royal Castle Limited; and many others. AWU is one of the first trade unions in our nation.

AWU has reformulated and expanded its Labour Relations Department to better serve all of its units as well as increasing numbers of unrepresented ("Off the Street") Workers as well as the launch of its first national weekly radio program, Work N Progress.

Work N Progress is the Union's weekly radio show on i95.5fm, Wednesdays at 2:30. The show is produced by Workers for national progress. It was created through the vision of the Union's President General Michael Prentice and was originally hosted by Steve Theodore and eventually by Raphael Friday then Janicia Rogers.

Executive

President General - Michael Prentice 
General Secretary - Cassandra Tommy Dabreo 
Treasure - Jenifer Julien

1st Vice President - Keith Hopkinson 
2nd Vice President - Ancil Wilson 
3rd Vice President - Raphael Friday

Assistant General Secretary - Deodath Seebaran 
Trustees - Helen Noray, Randy Medina, and Cheryl Assing 
Public Relations Officer - Derrick Singh

Committee Members - Gregory Franklyn, Paras Mack, and Karen Joseph

Labour Relations Department - Janicia Rogers, Steve Theodore and Tricia Moore

See also

 List of trade unions

Trade unions in Trinidad and Tobago